The Frischauf Lodge at Okrešelj is a mountain lodge that stands above the Logar Valley in northern Slovenia. It is surrounded by the following peaks: Cold Mountain, Styria Mount Rinka, Carinthia Mount Rinka, and Mount Turska. Nearby is  Rinka Falls. The lodge is named after Johannes Frischauf, and the first lodge was built in 1876 by an Austro-German hiking club. In 1907 it was destroyed by an avalanche and rebuilt again in 1908. In 1991 it was expanded and modernized.

Starting points 
 1 h: from the Logar Valley Hikers' Lodge

Neighbouring lodges 
 1½ h : to the Kamnik Saddle Lodge
 5½ h : to the Zois Lodge at Kokra Saddle, via Turski Žleb Ravine and the Sleme Pass
 4 h: to the Kranj Lodge at Ledine, via Savinja Saddle

Neighbouring peaks 
 2½ h: Brana
 3½ h: Carniola Mount Rinka
 3½ h: Cross
 3½ h: Cold Mountain
 4 h: Skuta
 3½ h: Styria Mount Rinka
 2 h: Mount Turska

See also
 Slovenian Mountain Hiking Trail

References
 Slovenska planinska pot, Planinski vodnik, PZS, 2012, Milenko Arnejšek - Prle, Andraž Poljanec

External links
 Routes, Description & Photos
 on PZS.s

Mountain huts in Slovenia
Kamnik–Savinja Alps